The Sabina River is a river in the South West of Western Australia.

The headwaters of the river rise in the Whicher Range near the edge of the Millbrook State Forest and then flowing in the northerly direction. The river crosses the Vasse Highway then Sues Road and finally Bussell Highway before discharging into Vasse Estuary near Busselton and finally into the Indian Ocean via Wonnerup Inlet and Geographe Bay.

Construction of a bridge over the Abba and Sabina rivers commenced in 1860, despite dreadful weather, and the rivers running high at the time.

References

Rivers of the South West region